Mbhazima Tshepo Rikhotso (born 26 February 1993) is a South African professional soccer player who plays as a centre-back for South African Premier Division side Royal AM. He is nicknamed 'the Giraffe'.

Club career
Born in Ndengeza, Rikhotso played for Vasco De Gama and Roses United before joining Bloemfontein Celtic in early 2015.

International career
Having also played for South Africa at under-23 level, Rikhotso was part of the South Africa squad for 2016 COSAFA Cup, and appeared in a 1–1 draw with Lesotho on 18 June 2016.

References

External links
 

1993 births
Living people
South African soccer players
South Africa international soccer players
Association football defenders
Vasco da Gama (South Africa) players
Roses United F.C. players
Bloemfontein Celtic F.C. players
National First Division players
South African Premier Division players